Jaydrathsinh was the State Minister of Gujarat Government from 2012 to 2021. He is a Member of Gujarat Legislative Assembly. Jaydrathsinh Parmar is member of erstwhile State Kanjari State in Panchmahal District.  Jaydrathsinh Parmar is an alumnus of Maharaja Sayajirao University of Baroda.

Political life
 MLA 11th Gujarat Legislative Assembly (Year 2002-07)
 MLA 12th Gujarat Legislative Assembly (Year 2007-12) 
 MLA 13th Gujarat Legislative Assembly (Year 2012-17) 
 Parliamentary Secretary, Food, Civil Supplies and Consumer Affairs Department (Year 2009-2011) - Hon. Minister of State for Roads & Buildings, Government of Gujarat. - Co-Incharge Minister, Dahod District (Year 2011-2012) - Hon. Minister of State for Roads & Buildings, capital project, Government of Gujarat (October 2013-August 2016)
 Hon. Minister of State for Roads & Buildings, Higher & Technical Education (August 2016 to December 2017) 
 Co-Incharge Minister, Mahisagar District (November 2013—May 2014) 
 Minister Incharge Chhotaudepur District : Co-Incharge Minister Valsad District (October 2013-August 2016) 
 Organization in charge of BJP, Vadodara (Rural) - Minister Incharge Mahisagar District (August 2016 to 2017) 4) MLA 14th Gujarat Legislative Assembly (Year 2017 to date) - Hon. Minister of State for Panchayat, Environment (Independent Charge), and Agriculture (State Minister). - Minister Incharge Anand District & Mahisagar Dist. (Dec. 2017 to date)

References

1964 births
State cabinet ministers of Gujarat
Living people
Gujarat MLAs 2012–2017
Bharatiya Janata Party politicians from Gujarat
Maharaja Sayajirao University of Baroda alumni